Salvia blepharophylla (eyelash-leaved sage) is a creeping perennial from the Mexican states of San Luis Potosí and Tamaulipas. The epithet, blepharophylla, is from the Greek for "with leaves fringed like eyelashes".

In full bloom the plant reaches  in height.

Notes

blepharophylla
Flora of Mexico